The following outline is provided as an overview of and topical guide to Jersey:

Jersey – British Crown dependency located in the Channel Islands off the coast of Normandy. As well as the island of Jersey itself, the bailiwick includes the nearly uninhabited islands of the Minquiers, Écréhous, the Pierres de Lecq and other rocks and reefs. Together with the Bailiwick of Guernsey it forms the grouping known as the Channel Islands. The defence of all these islands is the responsibility of the United Kingdom. However, Jersey is part of neither the UK nor the European Union; rather, like the Isle of Man, it is a separate possession of the Crown. Jersey belongs to the Common Travel Area.

General reference 

 Pronunciation:
 Common English country name:  Jersey
 Official English country name:  The Bailiwick of Jersey
 Common endonym(s):  
 Official endonym(s):  
 Adjectival(s):
 Demonym(s): Jerseymen
 Etymology: Name of Jersey
 ISO country codes:  JE, JEY, 832
 ISO region codes:  See ISO 3166-2:JE
 Internet country code top-level domain:  .je
 Bibliography of Jersey

Geography of Jersey 

Geography of Jersey
 Jersey is: A British Crown dependency
 Location:
 Northern Hemisphere and Western Hemisphere
 Europe
 Northern Europe
 Atlantic Ocean
 English Channel
 Time zone:  Western European Time or Greenwich Mean Time (UTC+00), Western European Summer Time or British Summer Time (UTC+01)
 Extreme points of Jersey
 High:  Les Platons 
 Low:  English Channel 0 m
 Land boundaries:  none
 Coastline:  English Channel 70 km
 Population of Jersey: 89,300 (December 31, 2006)  - 189th most populous country

 Area of Jersey: 116 km2
 Atlas of Jersey

Environment of Jersey 

 Climate of Jersey
 Renewable energy in Jersey
 Geology of Jersey
 Protected areas of Jersey
 Biosphere reserves in Jersey
 National parks of Jersey
 Wildlife of Jersey
 Fauna of Jersey
 Birds of Jersey
 Mammals of Jersey

Natural geographic features of Jersey 
 Islands of Jersey
 World Heritage Sites in Jersey: None

Regions of Jersey 

Parishes of Jersey

Ecoregions of Jersey 

List of ecoregions in Jersey
 Ecoregions in Jersey

Administrative divisions of Jersey 

Parishes of Jersey

The Channel Island of Jersey is divided into twelve parishes. All have access to the sea and are named after the saints to whom their ancient parish churches are dedicated:
Saint Helier (incorporating the island's capital)
Grouville (historically Saint Martin de Grouville; incorporating Les Minquiers)
Saint Brélade
Saint Clement
Saint John
Saint Lawrence
Saint Martin (historically Saint Martin le Vieux; incorporating Les Écréhous)
Saint Mary
Saint Ouen
Saint Peter
Saint Saviour
Trinity

Vingtaines of Jersey 

Vingtaine

Cities in Jersey 

 Capital of Jersey: Saint Helier
 Cities of Jersey

Demography of Jersey 

Demographics of Jersey

Proposed government and politics of Jersey 

Politics of Jersey
 Form of government:
 Capital of Jersey: Saint Helier
 Elections in Jersey
 Political parties in Jersey
 Politicians in Jersey

Branches of the government of Jersey 

Government of Jersey

Executive branch of the government of Jersey 
 Head of state: Duke of Normandy,
 Head of government: Chief Minister of Jersey,
 Council of Ministers of Jersey

Legislative branch of the government of Jersey 

 Parliament of Jersey (unicameral)

Judicial branch of the government of Jersey 

Courts of Jersey
 Law of Jersey

Foreign relations of Jersey 

 Diplomatic missions in Jersey
 Diplomatic missions of Jersey

International organization membership 
The Bailiwick of Jersey is a member of:
British-Irish Council (BIC)

Law and order in Jersey 

Law of Jersey
 Capital punishment in Jersey
 Constitution of Jersey
 Crime in Jersey
 Human rights in Jersey
 Jersey falls under the jurisdiction of:
 Human rights in the United Kingdom
 LGBT rights in Jersey
 Recognition of same-sex unions in Jersey
 Freedom of religion in Jersey
 Law enforcement in Jersey
 States of Jersey Customs and Immigration Service
 States of Jersey Police
 Honorary Police

Military of Jersey 

Military of Jersey
 Command
 Commander-in-chief: Lieutenant Governor of Jersey
 Forces
 Royal Militia of the Island of Jersey

Local government in Jersey 

Local government in Jersey
 Parish Assembly

History of Jersey 

History of Jersey
Timeline of the history of Jersey
Current events of Jersey
 List of Bailiffs of Jersey
 List of Viscounts of Jersey
 Military history of Jersey
 Battle of Jersey
 German occupation of the Channel Islands
 Civilian life under the German occupation of the Channel Islands

Culture of Jersey 

Culture of Jersey
 Architecture of Jersey
 Cuisine of Jersey
 Festivals in Jersey
 Languages of Jersey
 Media of Jersey
 National symbols of Jersey
 Coat of arms of Jersey
 Flag of Jersey
 National anthem of Jersey
 People of Jersey
 Public holidays in Jersey
 Records of Jersey
 Religion in Jersey
 Christianity in Jersey
 Church of England in Jersey
 Dean of Jersey
 Catholic Church in Jersey
 Hinduism in Jersey
 Islam in Jersey
 Judaism in Jersey
 Sikhism in Jersey
 Scouting in Jersey
 World Heritage Sites in Jersey: None

Art in Jersey 
 Art in Jersey
 Cinema of Jersey
 Literature of Jersey
 Music of Jersey
 Television in Jersey
 Theatre in Jersey

Sport in Jersey 

Sport in Jersey
 Rugby union in Jersey
 Jersey Football Association

Economy and infrastructure of Jersey 

Economy of Jersey
 Economic rank, by nominal GDP (2007): 136th (one hundred and thirty sixth)
 Agriculture in Jersey
 Banking in Jersey
 National Bank of Jersey
 Communications in Jersey
 Internet in Jersey
 JE postcode area
 Companies of Jersey
Currency of Jersey: Pound
ISO 4217: n/a (informally JEP)
 Energy in Jersey
 Energy policy of Jersey
 Oil industry in Jersey
 Health care in Jersey
 Mining in Jersey
 The International Stock Exchange
 Tourism in Jersey
 Transport in Jersey
 Airports in Jersey
 Rail transport in Jersey
 Roads in Jersey

Education in Jersey 

Education in Jersey
List of schools in Jersey

See also 

Jersey
Crown dependency
List of international rankings
Outline of Europe
Outline of geography
Outline of the United Kingdom

Further reading 
 Bibliography of Jersey

References

External links 

Government of Jersey
BBC Jersey
Jersey in The World Factbook
Jersey History
Jersey Independent visitors guide 
Jersey Legal Information Board (JLIB)
Jersey Tourism
Les Pâraîsses d'Jèrri en Jèrriais (map of parishes, coat-of-arms, and history)
Map of Jersey
Société Jersiaise
This is Jersey (Local Portal) 
Virtual Tour of the Channel Island of Jersey 

Jersey